John Sanny Åslund (born 29 August 1952) is a Swedish former football coach and former player. As a player, he represented Degerfors IF, AIK, Espanyol, and Werder Bremen during a career that spanned between 1971 and 1982. A full international between 1977 and 1979, he won five caps and scored two goals for the Sweden national team and was a part of their 1978 FIFA World Cup squad. As a coach, he most notably managed AIK and IFK Norrköping.

Club career 
Åslund started his career in Sörby IK in 1963 and moved on to the professionals and played for Degerfors IF in 1971, after one season he moved to AIK Fotboll, yet again he only played one season before moving on to Spanish RCD Espanyol in 1974 where he spent one year before being transferred to Werder Bremen of Germany. After his one-year spell in Germany, he returned to Swedish side AIK where he played between 1976 and 1982. During 1979 and 1980 he had a short spell in Malmö FF.

International career 
Åslund was an unused sub for the 1978 FIFA World Cup and managed to win five caps for the Sweden national team.

Post-playing career 
He is a former CEO for AIK, and he is the father of former AIK player Martin Åslund.

Career statistics

International 

 Scores and results list Sweden's goal tally first, score column indicates score after each Åslund goal.

References

External links
Profile at AIK Fotboll 

Living people
1952 births
Association football forwards
AIK Fotboll players
Malmö FF players
RCD Espanyol footballers
SV Werder Bremen players
Allsvenskan players
Bundesliga players
La Liga players
1978 FIFA World Cup players
Swedish footballers
Swedish expatriate footballers
Sweden international footballers
Expatriate footballers in Spain
Expatriate footballers in Germany
Swedish expatriate sportspeople in Spain
Swedish expatriate sportspeople in Germany
Swedish football managers
AIK Fotboll managers
IFK Norrköping managers
Väsby IK managers
AIK Fotboll directors and chairmen